The 1985 New York City Marathon was the 16th edition of the New York City Marathon and took place in New York City on 27 October.

Results

Men

Women

References

External links

New York City Marathon, 1985
Marathon
New York City Marathon
New York